IDMC may refer to:

 Internal Displacement Monitoring Centre
 IndyMac (stock symbol)
 Interactive & Digital Media Centre